Ronald Charles Strang (born 21 October 1940) is a former Zimbabwean cricket umpire. He stood in one ODI game in 1994. His sons Paul and Bryan are former Zimbabwean international cricketers.

See also
 List of One Day International cricket umpires

References

1940 births
Living people
Zimbabwean One Day International cricket umpires